Duck blood and vermicelli soup is a traditional delicacy of Nanjing, capital of Jiangsu province, and is also eaten in other regions of China. A similar dish is eaten in Poland, Belarus, and Lithuania, where it's called czernina.

Legend
Duck blood and vermicelli soup is a traditional delicacy in Nanjing. It is said that once there was a poor man in Nanjing. He killed a duck and used a bowl to hold the duck's blood, but accidentally dropped some vermicelli into the bowl. He cooked them together and surprisingly found that the soup was delicious. A rich man heard the story and employed the poor man to cook the dish for his family. The soup has been popular ever since.

Ingredients

Duck blood, vermicelli, dried fried tofu, dried small shrimp, duck gizzards, duck intestines, duck livers, shallots, ginger, sesame oil, caraway, (and possibly some other ingredients) are used to make the soup.

Authentic duck blood and vermicelli soup is cooked with more than twenty Chinese herbal medicines. Some of those who prepare it this way believe that these ingredients promote blood circulation, remove toxins and maintain beauty, as well as aiding digestion and warming the stomach.

The main ingredient, vermicelli, is made of sweet potato. It is smooth, soft, waxy and tasty. Other key ingredients are duck blood, dried fried tofu, dried small shrimps, duck gizzards, duck intestines, and duck livers. Furthermore, salt, shallots, gingers, sesame oil and caraway make this delicacy tastier. The soup coupled with various ingredients has visual appeal and is aromatic and flavorful.

See also

Blood soup
Chicken and duck blood soup
Czernina
Jiangsu cuisine
 List of Chinese soups
 List of duck dishes
 List of soups

References

Further reading
Coughlan, Helen (2005). The Brighter Side of the Road: Upbeat and Offbeat Yarns from Home and Abroad. Boolarong Press. 

Jiangsu cuisine
Chinese soups
Duck dishes
Blood soups
Food combinations